"One More Colour" is a song by the Canadian singer/songwriter Jane Siberry. It is the first single released in support of her third album The Speckless Sky, issued in 1985.

Composer Mychael Danna later rearranged the song for the 1997 film The Sweet Hereafter, where it is performed by Sarah Polley.

It was covered by Rheostatics on their 1994 album Introducing Happiness.

Formats and track listing 
All songs written by Jane Siberry.
Canadian 7" single (DSR 71019)
"One More Colour" – 4:30
"The Empty City" – 6:42

Charts

Personnel
Adapted from the One More Colour liner notes.

 Jane Siberry – vocals, guitar, keyboards, production
Musicians
 Anne Bourne – keyboards
 Al Cross – drums
 Ken Myhr – guitar, guitar synthesizer
 John Switzer – bass, production
 Rob Yale – Fairlight CMI, keyboards

Production and additional personnel
 John Naslen – production, engineering

Release history

References

External links 
 

1985 songs
1985 singles
Jane Siberry songs
Songs written by Jane Siberry
Song recordings produced by Jane Siberry
Duke Street Records singles